Mohamed Muse Diriye is a Somali politician, who is serving as the Minister of Water Resources of Somaliland. He has previously served as the Minister of Information of Somaliland, State Minister and Deputy Minister of Ministry of Interior of Somaliland. He is also served as the Governor of Togdheer region of Somaliland.

See also

 Ministry of Information and National Guidance (Somaliland)
 Ministry of Water Resources (Somaliland)
 Ministry of Interior (Somaliland)
 List of Somalis

References

People from Hargeisa
Peace, Unity, and Development Party politicians
Government ministers of Somaliland
Year of birth missing (living people)
Living people